Moishe Broderzon (November 23, 1890 – August 17, 1956) was a Yiddish poet, theatre director, and the founder of the Łódź literary group Yung-yidish.

He was born 1890 in Moscow, but his family was among the Jews expelled in 1891. His father moved to Łódź; his mother took her children to her father's home in Nesvizh (now in Belarus). In 1900, the family was reunited in Łódź.

He became a bookkeeper and began writing short narratives in the Yiddish press in Łódź. In 1914 he issued a collection of his poems called Shvartse fliterlekh (Black Spangles). He was a founder of Yung-Yidish artists collaborative.

When the Germans invaded Łódź, Broderson removed to Moscow and began publishing his poetry in the Yiddish press. With friends he established the Krayzl fun Yidish Natsyonaler Estetik (Circle for Jewish National Aesthetic). In 1918 he founded (with El Lissitzky, and writers Daniel Tsharni, Gershon Broyde, and Menashe Halpern) the Moscow Circle of Jewish Writers and Artists.

In 1918, at the age of 28, Broderzon returned to Łódź. He was a founder of the literary group Yung-yidish, which published a journal of the same name. The journal featured poetry, prose, and experimental art. His wife, Sheyne-Miryam, was an actress famed for a chasidic dance routine.

Broderzon also founded several theatres in Łódź: In 1922, with Yekhezkl-Moyshe Nayman, Yitschok Broyner, and Henech Kon he created the Yiddish Marionette Theater Khad Gadyo (Chad-gadye, Khad-gadye), and Shor habor, a variety theater. In 1924 he and Henekh Kon wrote the music for the first Yiddish opera performed in Warsaw, Dovid un Basheve (David and Bathseba), performed in Warsaw's Kaminski Theater; he also wrote a libretto for the opera Monish based on I. L. Peretz's epic romantic poem. In 1926 he began writing for the Azazel theater cafe in Warsaw. In 1927 he was one of the founders of the kleynkunst stage Ararat in Łódź, an experimental theater that featured the actors Shimon Dzigan and Israel Shumacher. He often wrote articles about Yiddish theater.

He and his wife, Sheyne Miriam, escaped from Poland into the Soviet Union in 1939 after the Nazi invasion. They worked in the Yiddish theatre in Moscow and became Soviet citizens. He was arrested in April 1950, sentenced to ten years in prison, and sent to Siberia. After five years in a labor camp he was "rehabilitated" in September 1955 and was allowed to return to Poland in July 1956; he was greeted there by a small number of literati who had reunited after the war. "But in despair at seeing a Poland that had become a Jewish cemetery and weakened by years in a labor camp, he died of a heart attack in Warsaw on 17 August 1956."Moshe Broderson was buried in the Jewish cemetery at Okopowa Street in Warsaw. After the devastation of the grave, his daughter Anetta (born 1920) transported her father's ashes to Israel to the Kiryat Sha'ul cemetery in Tel Aviv. Posthumously, his texts were used in performances of the Jewish Theatre in Warsaw: Sure Szejndl from 1966 and The Great Win from 1972 and 1985.

References

External links
 
 Fourteen poems by Moishe Broderzon in Yiddish and English at Poetry in Hell

1890 births
1956 deaths
Jewish cabaret performers
Writers from Łódź
Writers from Moscow
19th-century Polish Jews
Polish emigrants to Russia
Polish cabaret performers
Polish theatre directors
Jewish songwriters
Jewish poets
Yiddish-language poets
Yiddish theatre
20th-century comedians
Burials at Kiryat Shaul Cemetery